The 1952 Iowa State Cyclones football team represented Iowa State College of Agricultural and Mechanic Arts (later renamed Iowa State University) in the Big Seven Conference during the 1952 college football season. In their sixth year under head coach Abe Stuber, the Cyclones compiled a 3–6 record (1–5 against conference opponents), finished in sixth place in the conference, and were outscored by their opponents by a combined total of 199 to 158. They played their home games at Clyde Williams Field in Ames, Iowa.

The team's regular starting lineup on offense consisted of left end Barney Alleman, left tackle Jack Lessin, left guard Gean Kowalski, center Rollie Arns, right guard Carl Brettschneider, right tackle Bob Matheson, right end Bob Rohwedder, quarterback Rich Mann, left halfback Dick Cherpinsky, right halfback Emory Eichorn, and fullback Max Burkett. Carl Brettschneider and Bill Byrus were the team captains.

The team's statistical leaders included Dick Cherpinsky with 278 rushing yards, Rich Mann with 389 passing yards, Bob Rohwedder with 167 receiving yards, and Stan Cozzi with 24 points (four touchdowns) each. No Iowa State players were selected as first-team all-conference players.

Schedule

References

Iowa State
Iowa State Cyclones football seasons
Iowa State Cyclones football